Curt Bergsten (24 June 1912 – 21 July 1987) was a Swedish football forward who played for Sweden in the 1938 FIFA World Cup. He also played for Landskrona BoIS.

References

External links

1912 births
1987 deaths
Swedish footballers
Sweden international footballers
Association football forwards
Landskrona BoIS players
1938 FIFA World Cup players